Gerd Puritz (July 7, 1914 in Hamburg – June 5, 2007) was the son and biographer of the German soprano Elisabeth Schumann. He moved with his family to England in 1948 and worked for the German Service of the BBC. After the death of his first wife, Biddy, he remarried in 1997 and moved to the Netherlands with his Dutch wife in 2002 where he died. He is survived by his sons Christian and Rupert, his daughter Joy, and granddaughters Sophie and Alice.

Further reading

External links
 The Elisabeth Schumann website

1914 births
2007 deaths
German biographers
Male biographers
20th-century biographers
20th-century German male writers
German male non-fiction writers
German emigrants to the United Kingdom
British emigrants to the Netherlands